Aphaobiella is a genus of beetles belonging to the family Leiodidae.

Species:

Aphaobiella budnarlipoglavseki 
Aphaobiella kofleri 
Aphaobiella mlejneki 
Aphaobiella tisnicensis

References

Leiodidae